This is a list of bus routes operated by Sacramento Regional Transit District.

Regular routes
Regular bus routes serving Downtown Sacramento are featured in Blue
Express bus routes serving Downtown Sacramento are featured in Red

Shuttle service

The Neighborhood Ride routes

Former routes

Contracted shuttle services
These shuttles are operated by RT through a partnership with cities of Rancho Cordova, Granite Park, and North Natomas

Capital City hospital shuttles
Shuttle buses that provide service to/from RT LT stations to the hospitals within the Central area.

School day service
These routes operates during the school season (September to June). These were created on January 4, 2004.

Former school day service routes

Transit centers

Non-RT routes serving Sacramento
Although these routes were once part of RT's lineup, these agencies continue to service Sacramento using the assigned route numbers. The RT system originally excluded service to Sacramento International Airport, which was exclusively served by Yolobus until January 2020 when RT added express service between downtown Sacramento and the airport; Yolobus continues to serve the airport with local service. Service in Elk Grove that was formerly operated by RT is operated by e-tran, which reverted to RT in June 2019. This list also include other transit agencies that coordinate their services and fares with RT.

References

External links
System Map of the Sacramento Regional Transit
List of RT bus routes and descriptions

Routes
RT routes